Matsurida Gogh (foaled  March 15, 2003) is a Japanese Thoroughbred racehorse and the winner of the 2007 Arima Kinen.

Career

Matsurida Gogh's first race was on August 21, 2005, at Sapporo, where he came in first. 

He won the Hidaka Tokubetsu on August 19, 2006, and then won the Christmas Cup on December 23, 2006, to close the year.

He won the American Jockey Club Cup on January 21, 2007, and then took the Sankei Sho All Comers on September 23, 2007. 

He grabbed the biggest win of his career by winning the 2007 Arima Kinen on December 23. He then won the Nikkei Sho on March 29, 2008.

He won the Sankei Sho All Comers for a 2nd time on September 28, 2008, and then won it for a 3rd time on September 27, 2009. 

His final race was on December 27, 2009, when he finished in 7th at the Arima Kinen.

Pedigree

References

2003 racehorse births
Racehorses bred in Japan
Racehorses trained in Japan
Thoroughbred family 18